The 1999 Trophée des Champions was a football match held at Stade de la Licorne, Amiens on 24 July 1999, that saw 1999 Coupe de France winners FC Nantes defeat 1998–99 Division 1 champions FC Girondins de Bordeaux 1–0.

Match details

See also
1999–2000 French Division 1

1999–2000 in French football
1999
FC Girondins de Bordeaux matches
FC Nantes matches
July 1999 sports events in Europe
Sport in Amiens